Naijatastic styled as NAIJATASTIC is a Nigerian audio storage and music streaming website launched in 2017 by Seun Osundolire.

Naijatastic is best known among Nigerian talent and Nigerian/African music artists to upload and streaming audio content. This platform is also for new and independent artists. Registration and uploading audio content on the website is free.

Artists from all over the world upload their songs by themselves for distribution around the world. The users can also have the copyright of their work. Naijatastic's core genre is Afrobeat.

The website aims to promote awareness and maintain exposure for Nigerian audio content by Nigerian artists and reward them for their creative work and reduce piracy.

See also
tooXclusive

References

Nigerian music websites
Internet properties established in 2017
Music review websites